The 1978–79 Colorado Rockies season was the Rockies' third season and the fifth season of the franchise. Like three of the previous four seasons, the Rockies did not qualify for the playoffs.

Offseason

Regular season

Final standings

Schedule and results

Playoffs

Player statistics

Regular season
Scoring

Goaltending

Note: GP = Games played; G = Goals; A = Assists; Pts = Points; +/- = Plus/minus; PIM = Penalty minutes; PPG=Power-play goals; SHG=Short-handed goals; GWG=Game-winning goals
      MIN=Minutes played; W = Wins; L = Losses; T = Ties; GA = Goals against; GAA = Goals against average; SO = Shutouts;

Awards and records

Transactions

Draft picks
Colorado's draft picks at the 1978 NHL Amateur Draft held at the Queen Elizabeth Hotel in Montreal, Quebec.

Farm teams

See also
 1978–79 NHL season

References

External links

Colorado Rockies (NHL) seasons
Colorado
Colorado
Colorado
Colorado